Shawn Reid (born September 21, 1970) is a Canadian retired ice hockey defenseman who was an All-American for Colorado College.

Career
Reid began his college career in 1990, playing for Colorado College under Brad Buetow. While the team was fairly underwhelming that year, Reid led CC's defense with 10 goals. The team improved greatly the following year, producing its first non-losing season in a dozen years while Reid nearly doubled his point total. In Reid's junior year his scoring production declined drastically, mirroring the team's success on the ice. CC finished last in the WCHA but the news for his head coach got even worse. Buetow was charged with recruiting violations and eventually fired. He was replaced by Don Lucia and the change behind the bench brought CC newfound success; the team finished atop the WCHA standings for the first time in program history. Reid's scoring recovered and, though he didn't produce as much as he had as a sophomore, his overall performance led him to be named a first team All-American, the first for Colorado College in over a decade.

Reid embarked on a professional career after graduating, signing with the Binghamton Rangers. Over four years, Reid bounced between several teams across three leagues in North America. He was a solid contributor at most of his stops but Reid was unable to earn a promotion above the AAA level. After playing for 4 separate teams in 1998, Reid ended his hockey career.

Statistics

Regular season and playoffs

Awards and honors

References

External links

1970 births
Living people
AHCA Division I men's ice hockey All-Americans
Canadian ice hockey defencemen
Ice hockey people from Toronto
Colorado College Tigers men's ice hockey players
Binghamton Rangers players
Fort Wayne Komets players
Charlotte Checkers (1993–2010) players
San Antonio Dragons players
Tallahassee Tiger Sharks players
Richmond Renegades players
Grand Rapids Griffins players
Chicago Wolves players